Golujeh-ye Said (also Romanized as Golūjeh-ye Sa‘īd; also known as Golūjeh) is a village in Ujan-e Sharqi Rural District, Tekmeh Dash District, Bostanabad County, East Azerbaijan Province, Iran. At the 2006 census, its population was 307, in 71 families.

References 

Populated places in Bostanabad County